Guillermo Durán and Horacio Zeballos were the defending champions but chose not to participate.

Facundo Argüello and Roberto Maytín won the title after defeating Andrej Martin and Tristan-Samuel Weissborn 6–3, 6–4 in the final.

Seeds

Draw

References
 Main Draw

Franken Challenge - Doubles